Daniel Paul Johns (born 22 April 1979) is an Australian musician, singer, and songwriter best known as the former frontman, guitarist, and main songwriter of the rock band Silverchair. Johns is also one half of The Dissociatives with Paul Mac and one half of Dreams with Luke Steele. He released his first solo album, Talk, in 2015. Johns' second solo album, FutureNever, was released on 22 April 2022. In 2007, Johns was ranked at number 18 on Rolling Stones list of The 25 Most Underrated Guitarists. Johns has won 21 ARIA Awards from 49 nominations as a member of Silverchair, and has earned four other nominations as a solo artist.

Early life
Johns was born to Greg and Julie Johns. His father owned a fruit shop in Newcastle, and his mother was a housewife. He grew up in Merewether, New South Wales, Australia, with two younger siblings. Johns attended Newcastle High School, from which he graduated in 1997.

Career

Silverchair (1992–2011)
At the age of 12, Johns and school friends Ben Gillies and Chris Joannou formed a band, originally named "The Innocent Criminals", and practiced daily after school for periods of four hours or more.

The band's career began when the three members were 15 years old when a demo recording of their song "Tomorrow" won a competition that was run by the SBS TV programme Nomad. The group, now named Silverchair, subsequently accepted a three-album deal from Sony Music in 1994, and the label hurriedly released their first album Frogstomp in 1995 after "Tomorrow" remained in the No. 1 position on the Australian singles chart for six weeks.

The band released Freak Show in 1997, followed by Neon Ballroom in 1999, and then Diorama in 2002. Following Diorama, Silverchair embarked on a lengthy hiatus before the release of the next album.

In late 2005, Johns and Silverchair reunited and announced the production of a new album entitled Young Modern, whose title comes from a nickname given to Johns by composer Van Dyke Parks. The new album was released on 31 March 2007 and was followed by the Across the Great Divide tour with fellow Australian band Powderfinger.

In May 2011, Silverchair announced on their website that the band was going into "indefinite hibernation" and explained that "it's become increasingly clear that the spark simply isn't there between the three of us at the moment". Later that month, Johns and filmmaker Josh Wakely presented a talk at TEDx Sydney in which they discussed a film that they were working on that was tentatively titled My Mind's Own Melody. A video of the talk was uploaded to YouTube in June 2011, and a trailer for the completed film was released in mid-2012.

I Can't Believe It's Not Rock and The Dissociatives (2000–2004)
During the post-Diorama hiatus, Johns worked on several side projects, the most notable being The Dissociatives with dance musician/producer Paul Mac. Johns and Mac worked together since Mac's 1997 remix of "Freak" and his contribution to Neon Ballroom. In 2000, they recorded a five-track EP I Can't Believe It's Not Rock. Their debut album The Dissociatives (2004) was initially recorded in London, United Kingdom, and a few months later, the two regrouped in Sydney and Newcastle to finish off the project. The Dissociatives toured with musicians Kim Moyes on drums, Julian Hamilton on keys, and James Haselwood on bass.

Collaborations
On 13 June 2008, it was reported on Silverchair's website that Johns was working on a new side project with Luke Steele (The Sleepy Jackson, Empire of the Sun), but a release date was not confirmed for the collaboration. In 2008, the name of the project was "Hathaway and Palmer," according to a radio interview that Steele conducted, but this has not been confirmed since.

In December 2008, Johns was named as the producer of The Scare's album.

In 2012, Johns collaborated with the Australian Chamber Orchestra to create the soundtrack Atlas for a Qantas Airlines commercial that began airing a week before the 2012 Olympics. Johns explained:

When Qantas first approached me, I agreed to the project as I was really into the idea of creating a piece of music that represented Australia. I wanted it to sound big, something special. It was a conscious effort to create a good piece of music and not just a jingle. I've also wanted to work with the Australian Chamber Orchestra for a long time now, so it was great to finally be able to do that.

In May 2012, Johns wrote and recorded music with pop duo The Veronicas for the latter's third album. The writing process began in November 2011, and the twin sisters stated that working with Johns "was one of our greatest experiences."

As of January 2013, Johns was scheduled to appear in a live performance with Van Dyke Parks as part of Australia's Adelaide Festival on 8 March 2013 and was also rumoured to be working on a debut solo album. In May 2013, Steele revealed that he and Johns were completing the project that they had started in 2008.

In January 2014, Johns co-wrote the song "Impossible", released by Australian rapper 360, and also sang on the song's chorus. Johns met 360 through his brother Heath, who is also 360's publisher.

In 2016, Johns was a musical director and arranged and produced the music for the Netflix animated children's series Beat Bugs. He was also the singing voice for the characters Walter, and Mr. Mudwasp. He stated, "It's a dream job to go into the studio and dissect all of The Beatles' music". Johns said that Eddie Vedder liked his version with the guide vocals for "Magical Mystery Tour" so much that he kept Johns's backing vocals in the finished song.

In May 2016 Johns collaborated with Perth duo Slumberjack on their track "Open Fire", and also featured in the music video. In the same year he co-wrote and provided uncredited backing vocals to 'Say It' from Flume's Skin LP.

Johns has also worked with artists such as Zhu in the track "Modern Conversation" in 2017 and fellow Australian artist What So Not in the album Not All The Beautiful Things, released in 2018, where he contributed to a good portion of the music.

Johns premiered the band 'Boom Tish' back in 2017. They've released just one song, a cover of The Easybeats' 'Hello, How Are You'. However, band members Beau Golden and Dave Jenkins Jnr both posted new photos of Boom Tish in the studio in January 2020. Boom Tish evolved out of Johns' live band for his consecutive Sydney Opera House shows in 2015.

Johns teamed up with Luke Steele from Empire of the Sun to form Dreams, releasing the single "No One Defeats Us" in March 2018. Dreams' debut album, No One Defeats Us, was released in September 2018 through EMI.

Solo career (2013–present)
In November 2013, it was reported by various media outlets that Johns was in the process of working on a solo album due for release sometime in 2014. His manager John Watson was quoted as saying: "it's looking extremely likely that it'll be out next year."

For the 40th birthday of the Triple J radio station, Beat the Drum, held at Sydney, Australia's Domain on 16 January 2015, Johns performed a piano version of Nirvana's "Smells Like Teen Spirit".

Johns debuted a new song as a solo artist on 29 January 2015 on the Triple J radio station. Titled "Aerial Love", Peter Vincent, National Music Editor of The Sydney Morning Herald, described the song as "sexy" and "soulful". "Aerial Love" debuted at No. 50 on the Australian Singles Chart, later peaking at No. 21. Johns released his fifteen-track debut album as a solo artist on 22 May 2015, entitled Talk. The record features multilayered arrangements of R&B, soul, synthpop, and electronic melodies. Talk peaked at No. 2 on the ARIA Albums Chart in Australia within the first two weeks of its release. The album also achieved some unexpected success in other parts of the world, coming in at No. 1 on the Slovakian iTunes albums chart shortly after release.

In October 2021, Johns released a Spotify Original Podcast, Who Is Daniel Johns?, of which he is both the host and subject. The five-part podcast, produced by Kaitlyn Sawrey, Amelia Chappelow and Frank Lopez, features interviews with key figures in Johns' life, including ex-wife Natalie Imbruglia, Paul Mac, Van Dyke Parks and Billy Corgan. Who Is Daniel Johns? became Spotify's most popular podcast in Australia. In an October 2021 interview on Network 10's The Project to promote the podcast, Johns said that while he still plans to work on new music, he may never play live again.

On 7 December 2021, Johns announced via a personal letter to fans that his second solo album, FutureNever, would be released on 1 April 2022, however was later pushed back to 22 April. The album was made available for pre-order on the FutureNever.art website. FutureNever is the first album Johns released on his own label via a new global deal with BMG.

Controversy
In July 2007, Johns claimed on Australian radio station Triple J that he had shared a joint with his then-wife Natalie Imbruglia, Australian Federal MP and ex-Midnight Oil frontman Peter Garrett, and U2 frontman Bono in November 2006 while they listened to a demo recording of Silverchair's album Young Modern. In response, Tony Wood, whose daughter Anna Wood died of water intoxication secondary to use of MDMA, suggested that Garrett be subject to a drug test. Garrett asserted that he had not touched marijuana since his twenties, and Johns said the original statement was a joke, adding he thought it would be obvious that it was a joke, as both Garrett and Bono were publicly against drugs.

Johns, who was arrested for driving under the influence, told police that he had consumed four large wines between 4.30pm and 7.40pm. Johns was required to attend a traffic offenders course; he reappeared in Newcastle Local Court in February 2015 and was convicted of mid-range drunk driving, receiving an $880 fine and disqualification from driving until June 2015. "I made a mistake, for which I am really sorry," the singer told reporters outside the court that day. "I completed the traffic offenders program, and it will never happen again." However, in March 2022, Johns was again charged with a DUI (this time in the high range, testing 0.157, which is more than three times the legal limit) after his SUV crossed to the wrong side of the Pacific Highway at North Arm Cove and collided with a van travelling in the opposite direction. A woman passenger of the van was hospitalised, but there were no serious injuries and she was released from the hospital that same night. Johns said of the incident, "I have to step back now as I'm self-admitting to a rehabilitation centre and I don't know how long I'll be there." Johns said he had been medicating with alcohol to deal with his PTSD, anxiety and depression. On 7 July 2022, Johns was sentenced. The judge said the charge was serious but Johns' background and circumstances were exceptional and gave him a relatively light punishment by disqualifying him from driving for seven months and a 10-month intensive corrections order.

On 11 August 2019, The Sunday Telegraph and the Daily Mail published a false story about Johns alleging that he had been spending his time at a notorious Sydney S&M brothel and bondage club called The Kastle. Johns sued The Sunday Telegraph and the Daily Mail for defamation and denied the allegations, describing them as "simply untrue" and "hurtful, humiliating, and damaging to me and my family". The Kastle's proprietor also denied that Johns had ever been at the club. The Telegraph's publisher News Corp has paid Johns a $470,000 settlement. The Sunday Telegraph issued a retraction and apology to Johns on 3 May 2020. The Daily Mail issued a retraction and apology on 8 August 2020: "The story was wrong. Mr Johns had not been there and he has never been there. Daily Mail retracts the story and apologises to Mr Johns for the error and for the hurt and damage caused to him."

Personal life
In late 1997, during the Freak Show tour, Johns experienced depression amid rumours that he was suffering from a drug addiction/eating disorder. Johns explained in a Rolling Stone Australia interview that he had developed anorexia nervosa. Johns claimed that he weighed less than 50 kilos (110 lbs) at his thinnest. With Neon Ballroom came the single "Ana's Song" about Johns' battle with anorexia. In 2004, Johns spoke at length to ABC interviewer Andrew Denton and revealed that at one point he had considered suicide.

After recording Diorama, Johns was diagnosed with a rare but serious case of reactive arthritis. After treatment in Los Angeles, he was able to tour with the band for the Across the Night Tour. Reports of the arthritic symptoms did not resurface after the completion of the tour.

After putting Silverchair into "indefinite hibernation" in 2011, Johns retreated to his home in Merewether, New South Wales which he describes as a "'70s porn palace" out of Boogie Nights. "I just wanted to not be in the industry and not be famous and not have anything to do with it," he said. "I felt like I was losing who I was. I was becoming the lead singer of Silverchair more than I wanted to be." Johns checked the surf conditions obsessively every morning even though he hadn't surfed since his teens. Johns admitted to not being very social and spent four years hiding and shutting things out. He kept company with his shar-pei–whippet crossbred dog named Gia and watched movies with the blinds closed and ordered online grocery delivery.

Johns is also known for his animal rights support, having revealed that he is a vegan in 1998, although it was stated that he is a pescetarian in 2009. The Neon Ballroom song "Spawn Again" features Johns' views on animal liberation, but he stated in a subsequent interview: "I'm not telling people how to eat or how to change their lives, I just wanted to express my opinion in a song and it's something, as I said, I feel very strongly about so that's just how I express myself through music."

In 1999, Johns met Australian actress, singer, and model Natalie Imbruglia backstage at a Silverchair concert in London. They started dating after meeting again at the ARIA awards after-party at the Gazebo Hotel in Sydney in October of the same year. After years of an on-and-off relationship, Johns announced his engagement to long-time girlfriend Imbruglia shortly before Christmas 2002, and they married on New Year's Eve 2003. Johns wrote the song "Satisfied" for Imbruglia's 2005 album Counting Down the Days, which he also produced, and co-wrote the song "Want" from Imbruglia's 2009 album Come to Life. Imbruglia wrote her 2005 single "Counting Down the Days" about their long-distance relationship, as Imbruglia was based in London and Johns in Newcastle. On 4 January 2008, they announced that they were divorcing, stating, "We have simply grown apart through not being able to spend enough time together."

In July 2008, The Daily Telegraph announced Johns was dating Australian model Louise Van der Vorst. In 2009, the couple moved from Australia to New York City so that Van der Vorst could expand her modelling career. By July 2011, the couple were living together in Newcastle, Australia. In April 2012, it was reported that Johns had initiated the dissolution of the relationship in February 2012. As of early 2013, Johns was dating fashion designer Estelita Huijer, with whom he was photographed in Crown Street in Sydney. Johns commenced a relationship with former model Michelle Leslie in October 2016.

Discography

Studio albums

Singles

As lead artist

As featured artist

Awards and nominations

APRA Awards
The APRA Awards are held in Australia and New Zealand by the Australasian Performing Right Association to recognise songwriting skills, sales and airplay performance by its members annually.

! 
|-
| rowspan="3"| 2008
| rowspan="2"|"Straight Lines"
| Song of the Year
| 
| rowspan="3"| 
|-
| Most Played Australian Work
| 
|-
| Daniel Johns
| Songwriter of the Year
| 
|-
| 2016
| "Aerial Love"
| Song of the Year
| 
| 
|-
| 2023 
| "I Feel Electric"
| Song of the Year 
|  
|  
|-

ARIA Music Awards
The ARIA Music Awards is an annual awards ceremony that recognises excellence, innovation, and achievement across all genres of Australian music.

! 
|-
| 2002
| Silverchair's Diorama
| Producer of the Year
| 
|
|-
|rowspan="2"| 2015
| Daniel Johns Talk
| Best Male Artist
| 
|rowspan="2"|
|-
| Lorin Askill for Daniel Johns – "Aerial Love"
| ARIA Award for Best Video
| 
|-
| rowspan="1"| 2022
| rowspan="1"| FutureNever
| Best Solo Artist
| 
| rowspan="1"| 
|-

References

External links

 
 Official Silverchair website

1979 births
20th-century Australian male singers
20th-century guitarists
21st-century Australian male singers
21st-century guitarists
APRA Award winners
ARIA Award winners
Australian child singers
Australian male singer-songwriters
Australian multi-instrumentalists
Australian rock guitarists
Australian rock singers
Child rock musicians
Living people
Australian male guitarists
Musicians from New South Wales
People from Newcastle, New South Wales
Silverchair members
The Dissociatives members